The LPGA Tour Championship, in full the LPGA Tour Championship Presented by Rolex, was the season-ending women's professional golf tournament on the U.S.-based LPGA Tour. After two seasons it was discontinued, replaced by the CME Group Titleholders in 2011.

The tournament was created in 2009 to replace the ADT Championship, which was discontinued after ADT decided not to extend its sponsorship. The LPGA Tour Championship was not considered an extension of the ADT and its inaugural edition was in 2009.

Stanford Financial and SEC action

In November 2008 Stanford Financial was announced as the new sponsor of the tournament with a purse of $2 million. On February 17, 2009 the Securities and Exchange Commission accused Stanford chairman Allen R. Stanford in an $8 billion investment fraud scheme, and the Houston offices of Stanford Financial were raided and the firm's assets were frozen. In response to this action, the LPGA issued a statement that it was "monitoring developments regarding the situation." 

On May 26, 2009, the LPGA announced that the tournament would still take place, without a sponsor and with the purse lowered to $1.5 million. 
The tournament would be known as the LPGA Tour Championship. In September, Rolex was added as the presenting sponsor. The 2009 tournament was played at the Houstonian Golf and Country Club in Richmond, Texas, southwest of Houston.

Importance in year-end awards
In close races for LPGA season titles, the last tournament of the year often determines the winners of the year-end awards: Player of the Year, Rookie of the Year, Vare Trophy (lowest scoring average), and the Money List leader.

2009 tournament
Anna Nordqvist of Sweden finished the 54 holes at 13-under par, carding a 65 in the third round on Monday for a two stroke-victory over runner-up Lorena Ochoa. The tournament was originally planned as a 72-hole event, but November weather intervened; Friday's second round was delayed and then curtailed by darkness, and weekend play was canceled due to rain.  The second round was completed on Monday morning and the 36-hole cut was made, and the third round commenced immediately in calm and sunny conditions. The final day also held a large amount of suspense for the Player of the Year race between top-ranked Lorena Ochoa of Mexico and the year's leading rookie, Jiyai Shin of South Korea. Ochoa's second-place finish secured the Player of the Year award.

2010 tournament
After months of uncertainty, the LPGA announced in early August that the 2010 LPGA Tour Championship would be played December 2–5  at the Grand Cypress Golf Club in Orlando, Florida.
The 120-player field was reduced to the top-70 and ties after 36 holes, and the top-30 and ties after 54 holes.  Maria Hjorth of Sweden shot a final round 72 to finish at 283 (-5) and won by a single stroke over runner-up Amy Yang.

Field of players
The field was made up of the top 120 players on the LPGA official money list following the Mizuno Classic in November.

Winners

1 The 2009 tournament was shortened to 54 holes due to weather.

Tournament records

References

External links
LPGA official tournament microsite

Former LPGA Tour events
Golf in Texas
Golf in Florida
Women's sports in Florida
Women's sports in Texas